Maurice Arnoult (30 April 1897 – 25 October 1959) was a French racing cyclist. He rode in the 1923 Tour de France.

References

1897 births
1959 deaths
French male cyclists
Place of birth missing